Les Misérables is a 2000 French television miniseries based on the 1862 novel of the same name by Victor Hugo. It was broadcast in four ninety-minute parts. This adaptation is widely considered to be the most faithful to the novel, maintaining the setting, time period and covers the full arc of the story.

The original French language  broadcast was critically acclaimed and is considered one of the best television adaptations, especially in its home country of France. However, the truncated three-hour English version was derided for bad acting and is considered very poor. The producers opted to co-film entire scenes in English, instead of using dubbing. The largely French ensemble struggled to deliver solid performances in English.

Episodes

Cast

Home media

See also
 Adaptations of Les Misérables

References

External links 
 

2000 French television series debuts
2000 French television series endings
2000s French television miniseries
2000s French drama television series
Television shows based on French novels
Television shows set in France
Works based on Les Misérables
Television series set in the 1830s
Films directed by Josée Dayan